In the United Kingdom an act of Parliament is primary legislation passed by the Parliament of the United Kingdom.

An act of Parliament can be enforced in all four of the UK constituent countries (England, Scotland, Wales and Northern Ireland). As a result of devolution the majority of acts that are now passed by Parliament apply either to England and Wales only, or England only. Generally acts only relating to constitutional and reserved matters now apply to the whole of the United Kingdom.

A draft piece of legislation is called a bill. When this is passed by Parliament and given Royal Assent, it becomes an act and part of statute law.

Classification of legislation 

Acts of Parliament are classified as either "public general acts" or "local and personal acts" (also known as "private acts").  Bills are also classified as "public", "private", or "hybrid".

Public general acts 
Public general acts form the largest category of legislation, in principle affecting the public general law applying to everyone across the entire United Kingdom, or at least to one or more of its constituent countries of England, Northern Ireland, Scotland, or Wales.  Most Public General Acts proceed through Parliament as a public bill. Occasionally a bill is treated as hybrid.

Local and personal acts (private acts) 

Private acts are either local or personal in their effect, applying to a specifically named locality or legal person in a manner different from all others. Private bills are "usually promoted by organisations, like local authorities or private companies, to give themselves powers beyond, or in conflict with, the general law. Private bills only change the law as it applies to specific individuals or organisations, rather than the general public. Groups or individuals potentially affected by these changes can petition Parliament against the proposed bill and present their objections to committees of MPs and Lords." 

They include acts to confer powers on certain local authorities, a recent example being the Canterbury City Council Bill, which makes provisions relating to street trading and consumer protection in the city. Private bills can also affect certain companies: the Northern Bank Bill allowed the statutory right of Northern Bank to issue bank notes to be transferred to Danske Bank which had acquired it. Other private bills may affect particular companies established by act of Parliament such as TSB Bank and Transas.

Personal acts are a sub-category of private acts, which confer specific rights or duties on a named individual or individuals, for example allowing two persons to marry even though they are within a "prohibited degree of consanguinity or affinity" such as stepfather and stepdaughter.

Private bills, common in the 19th century, are now rare, as new planning legislation introduced in the 1960s removed the need for many of them. Only a few, if any, are passed each year.

Parliamentary authorities maintain a list of all private bills before parliament.

Hybrid bills 
Hybrid bills combine elements of both public and private bill. While they propose to make changes to the general law, they also contain provisions applying to specific individuals or bodies. Recent examples are the Crossrail Bill, a hybrid bill to build a railway across London from west to east, and the 1976 Aircraft and Shipbuilding Industries Bill, which was a particularly controversial bill that was ruled to be a hybrid bill, forcing the government to withdraw some of its provisions to allow its passage as a public bill. Once passed, hybrid bills are printed as part of the public general acts.

Parliamentary authorities maintain a list of all hybrid bills before parliament.

Other types of classification

Private members' bills 

It is important not to confuse private bills with private members' bills, which are public bills intended to effect a general change in the law. The only difference from other public bills is that they are brought forward by a private member (a backbencher) rather than by the government. Twenty private members' bills per session are allowed to be introduced, with the sponsoring private members selected by a ballot of the whole house, and additional bills may be introduced under the Ten Minute Rule.

Financial bills 
Financial bills raise revenue and authorise how money is spent. The best-known such bills are the normally annual Finance Bills introduced by the Chancellor of the Exchequer in the Budget. This usually encompasses all the changes to be made to tax law for the year. Its formal description is "a Bill to grant certain duties, to alter other duties, and to amend the law relating to the National Debt and the Public Revenue, and to make further provision in connection with finance". Consolidated Fund and Appropriation Bills authorise government spending.

Housekeeping bills 
This type of bill is designed to keep the business of government and public affairs up to date. These bills may not be substantial or controversial in party political terms. Two sub-classes of the housekeeping bill are consolidation bills, which set out existing law in a clearer and more up-to-date form without changing its substance; and the tax law rewrite bills, which do the same for tax law.

Delegated legislation 

An act of Parliament will often confer power on the Queen in Council, a Minister, or another public body to create delegated legislation, usually by means of a Statutory Instrument.

Stages of a bill 

Bills may start their passage in either the House of Commons or House of Lords, although bills which are mainly or entirely financial will start in the Commons. Each bill passes through the following stages:

Consultation, drafting and pre-legislative scrutiny 
Although not strictly part of the legislative process, a period of consultation will take place before a bill is drafted. Within government, the Treasury and other departments with an interest will be consulted along with the devolved administrations in Scotland, Wales and Northern Ireland. Outside government, interested parties such as trade unions, industry bodies and pressure groups will be asked for their views on any proposals. The Cabinet Office Code of Practice specifies a minimum consultation period of twelve weeks. Consultation documents are widely circulated (see for example the Home Office consultation on extreme pornography and the Scottish Government's consultation on food policy).

The character of the consultation is shaped by the government's determination to press forward with a particular set of proposals. A government may publish a green paper outlining various legislative options or a white paper, which is a clear statement of intent. It is increasingly common for a small number of Government bills to be published in draft before they are presented in Parliament.  These bills are then considered either by the relevant select committee of the House of Commons or by an ad hoc joint committee of both Houses.  This provides an opportunity for the committee to express a view on the bill and propose amendments before it is introduced.

Draft bills allow more lengthy scrutiny of potential legislation and have been seen as a response to time pressures which may result in the use of programme orders to impose a strict timetable on the passage of bills and what is known as 'drafting on the hoof', where the government introduces amendments to its own bills. With increased time for scrutiny backed up with considered evidence, draft bills may present governments with difficulty in getting their way.

The sponsoring government department will then write to the relevant policy committee of the Cabinet. The proposals are only discussed at a meeting if disagreements arise. Even an uncontroversial proposal may face administrative hurdles. A potential change in the law may have to wait for a more extensive bill in that policy area to be brought forward before it is worthwhile devoting parliamentary time to it. The proposal will then be bundled together with more substantive measures in the same Bill. The Ministerial Committee on the Legislative Programme (LP), including the leaders and government chief whips in both houses, is responsible for the timetable of legislation. This committee decides which house a bill will start in, recommends to the Cabinet which proposals will be in the Queen's Speech, which will be published in draft and how much parliamentary time will be required.

Following a process of consultation, the sponsoring department will send drafting instructions to parliamentary counsel, expert lawyers working for the government responsible for writing legislation. These instructions will describe what the bill should do but not the detail of how this is achieved. The Parliamentary counsel must draft the legislation clearly to minimise the possibility of legal challenge and to fit the bill in with existing UK, European Union and delegated legislation. A finished bill must be approved or scrutinised by the sponsoring department and minister, parliamentary counsel and LP.

The final stage is the submission of the bill to the authorities of the House in which it is to start its legislative journey. In the Commons, this is the Clerk of Legislation and the Public Bill Office in the Lords. They will check the following:

That the bill complies with the rules of the house
That everything in the bill is covered by its 'long title' (text describing the purposes of the bill)
In the Commons, that every provision requiring expenditure or levying taxes is identified and printed in italics
Whether the Royal Prerogative is affected
Whether it conflicts with or duplicates any bill which has already been introduced

After this process, the bill is then ready for introduction.

First reading 

The first reading is a formality and no debate or vote occurs. A notice that a bill is being presented for its first reading appears on the Order Paper for that day. The European Union (Amendment) Bill appeared on the Order Paper for 17 December 2007 as follows:

As we can see in this video footage of the first reading, the MP is called by the Speaker at the commencement of public business and brings a 'dummy bill', a sheet of paper with the short and long titles and the names of up to twelve supporters, to the Clerk of the House at the Table. The Clerk reads out the short title and the Speaker says "Second reading what day?" For all government bills, the response is almost always "tomorrow", or the next sitting day.

A date is also set for private members bills. The decision for scheduling such bills is crucial as they are not given 'government time' to be debated. The bill is recorded in the proceedings as having been read for a first time, having been ordered to be printed and to be read a second time on a particular date. 

In the case of a Government Bill, Explanatory Notes, which try to explain the effect of the Bill in more simple language, are also usually ordered to be printed. Again, in the case of the European Union (Amendment) Bill this appeared in Hansard as follows:

A bill introduced in this way is known as a presentation bill. Bills can also be introduced in the Commons by being brought in from the Lords, being brought in by resolution (like the Finance Bill) or when an MP gets leave to bring in a ten-minute rule bill.

A Government Bill can be introduced first into either House. Bills which begin in the Lords have '[Lords]' suffixed to its title when in the Lords and '[HL]' when in the Commons. Bills which deal primarily with taxation or public expenditure begin their passage in the Commons since the financial privileges of that House mean that it has primacy in these matters (see Parliament Acts 1911 and 1949). Conversely, bills relating to the judicial system, Law Commission bills and consolidation bills begin their passage in the House of Lords which by convention has primacy in these matters.

Second reading 
In the second reading, which in theory is supposed to occur two weekends after the first reading, a debate on the general principles of the bill is followed by a vote. This is the main opportunity to debate the principle of the bill rather than individual clauses. A division at this stage, therefore, represents a direct challenge to the principle of the bill. If the bill is read a second time, it proceeds to the committee stage.

Normally, the Second Reading of a Government bill is approved. A defeat for a Government bill on this Reading usually signifies a major loss. The last time this happened was at the second reading of the Shops Bill for the government of Margaret Thatcher in 1986. The bill, which liberalised controls on Sunday trading, was defeated in the Commons by 14 votes.

Second reading debates on government bills usually take a day, in practice about six hours. Smaller and less controversial bills will receive less time and wholly uncontroversial measures will receive a second reading 'on the nod' with no debate whatsoever. The National Insurance Contributions bill appeared in the Order Papers as follows:

As we can see from video footage of the debate for this bill, second readings of government bills take place on a motion moved (for Government bills) by a minister in the department responsible for the legislation "that the bill now be read a second time". The minister outlines the overall purpose of the Bill and highlights particular parts of the Bill they consider most important. The official Opposition spokesperson responds with his or her views on the Bill. The debate continues with other Opposition parties and backbench MPs giving their opinions on the principles of the Bill. 

The minister will eventually bring the debate to a conclusion by saying, of the bill, "I commend it to the House". The Speaker will then put the question by saying, for example, "The Question is, that the Bill be now read a second time". The Speaker then invites supporters of the bill to say "aye" and then opponents say "no": first he says, "All members of that opinion say 'aye, and supporters say 'aye'; then the speaker says "contrary 'no, and opponents say 'no'. In what is known as collecting the voices the Speaker makes a judgement as to the loudest cry.

A clear majority, either way, will prompt the response "I think the Ayes/Noes have it". This can be forced to a division by continued cries either way. If the result is at all in doubt, a division will be called and the Speaker will say "Division. Clear the Lobby". This refers not to the division lobbies used for voting, but the Members' Lobby beyond the chamber which is cleared by the doorkeepers. At this point, division bells will ring throughout the palace and also in nearby flats, pubs and restaurants whose owners pay to be connected to the system. This allows MPs who may not be in the debate to come and vote on the issue in question.

After two minutes, the Speaker will put the Question again to assess whether there is still disagreement. He will then name the tellers, whose job it is to count the votes. These will usually be government and opposition whips. In the example we have looked at: "Tellers for the Ayes Mr. Dave Watts and Mr. Steve McCabe. Tellers for the Noes Mr. Nick Hurd and Mr. John Baron". If no teller has come forward, or only one, the Speaker declares the result for the other side.

One teller from each side goes to the end of each division lobby and they count MPs as they emerge. Whips are also at the other end of the lobby to try to ensure that their MPs vote with the party line. The names are taken by division clerks and are published in Hansard the next day (see example from Hansard or with greater clarity from the Public Whip). Eight minutes after first calling the division, the Speaker says "lock the doors". The doorkeepers lock the doors leading into the lobbies and no more MPs can get in to vote.

When every member has passed the division clerks and tellers, a division slip is produced by the Clerks at the Table and is given to one of the tellers on the winning side. The tellers then form up at the Table in front of the Mace facing the Speaker, and the teller with the slip reads the result to the House, for example: "The Ayes to the right, 291. The Noes to the left, 161". The Clerk then takes the slip to the Speaker, who repeats the result and adds "So the Ayes have it, the Ayes have it. Unlock." The doorkeepers then unlock the doors to the division lobbies. A division vote concerning a National Insurance Contributions Bill is illustrated from Hansard as follows:

Divisions on second readings can be on a straight opposition or a vote on a 'reasoned amendment', detailing the reasons the bill's opponents do not want it read a second time, which may be selected by the Speaker. Bills defeated at a second reading cannot progress further or be reintroduced with exactly the same wording in the same session.

Procedural orders and resolutions 
In the case of Government Bills, the House normally passes forthwith (i.e. without debate but almost always with a vote) a Programme Order in the form of a programme motion, setting out the timetable for the committee and remaining stages of the Bill. This takes place immediately after the second reading. For example:

The House may also pass a separate money resolution, authorising any expenditure arising from the Bill; and/or a ways and means resolution, authorising any new taxes or charges the Bill creates. Bills are not programmed in the House of Lords.

Committee stage 
This usually takes place in a standing committee in the Commons and on the floor of the House in the Lords.  In the United Kingdom, the House of Commons utilises the following committees on bills:
 Standing Committee: Despite the name, a standing committee is a committee specifically constituted for a certain bill. Its membership reflects the strengths of the parties in the House. It is now known as a Public Bill Committee.
 Special Standing Committee: The committee investigates the issues and principles of the bill before sending it to a regular Standing Committee.  This procedure has been used very rarely in recent years (the Adoption and Children Bill in 2001–2002 is the only recent example); the pre-legislative scrutiny process (see above) is now preferred. This type of committee is now also known as a Special Public Bill Committee.
 Select Committee: A specialised committee that normally conducts oversight hearings for a certain department considers the bill. This procedure has not been used in recent years, with the exception of the quinquennial Armed Forces Bill, which is always referred to a select committee.
 Committee of the Whole House: The whole house sits as a committee in the House of Commons to consider a bill.  Bills usually considered in this way are the principal parts of the annual Finance Bill (the 'budget'), bills of first-class constitutional importance (for example, the European Union (Withdrawal) Act 2018), and bills that are so uncontroversial that the committee stage may be dispensed with quickly and easily on the floor of the house, without the need to nominate a committee (some private members' bills are usually dealt with this way each year). This is also the procedure used in the Lords.
 Grand Committee (House of Lords): This is a recent new procedure used for some bills which is intended to speed up business. Although it takes place in a separate room, it is technically still a committee of the whole house in that all members can attend and participate. Procedure is the same as for a committee in the main chamber, but there are no votes.

The committee considers each clause of the bill and may make amendments to it.  Significant amendments may be made at committee stage.  In some cases, whole groups of clauses are inserted or removed.  Almost all the amendments which are agreed to in committee will have been tabled by the government to correct deficiencies in the bill, to enact changes to policy made since the bill was introduced (or, in some cases, to import material which was not ready when the bill was presented), or to reflect concessions made as a result of earlier debate.

Report stage 
The report state, known formally as "consideration", takes place on the Floor of the House, and is a further opportunity to amend the bill. Unlike committee stage, the House need not consider every clause of the bill, only those to which amendments have been tabled.

Third reading 
In the third reading, a debate on the final text of the bill, as amended. In the Lords, further amendments may be made on third reading, in the Commons, it is usually a short debate followed by a single vote. Amendments are not permitted.

Passage 
The bill is then sent to the other House (to the Lords, if it originated in the Commons; to the Commons if it is a Lords bill), which may amend it. The Commons may reject a bill from the Lords outright. The Lords may amend a bill from the Commons but, if they reject it, the Commons may force it through without the Lords' consent in the following Session of Parliament, as is detailed below. 

The Lords can neither initiate nor amend money bills, bills dealing exclusively with public expenditure or the raising of revenue. Whether a bill is a money bill is decided by the Speaker of the House of Commons. If the other House amends the bill, the bill and amendments are sent back for a further stage.

There is a constitutional convention that the House of Lords should not spend more than 60 days over bills sent to them by the Commons.

The Parliament Acts: Under the Parliament Acts 1911 and 1949, which do not apply for bills seeking to extend Parliament's length to more than five years, if the Lords reject a bill originated in the House of Commons, then the Commons may pass that bill again in the next session. The bill is then submitted for Royal Assent even though the Lords did not pass it. If the Lords do not approve of a money bill within thirty days of passage in the Commons, the bill is submitted for Royal Assent nevertheless.

Consideration of amendments 
The House in which the bill originated considers the amendments made in the other House. It may agree to them, amend them, propose other amendments in lieu or reject them. A bill may pass backwards and forwards several times at this stage, as each House amends or rejects changes proposed by the other, a process referred to colloquially as parliamentary ping-pong. If each House insists on disagreeing with the other, the bill is lost under the 'double insistence' rule, unless avoiding action is taken.

Enacting formula 

Each act commences with one of the following:

Standard:

For money bills:

Without consent of the Lords, under the Parliament Acts 1911 and 1949:

Devolution

As a result of devolution, the National Assembly for Wales, the Northern Ireland Assembly, and the Scottish Parliament are also able to create primary legislation for their respective devolved institutions. These devolved legislatures are able to create legislation regarding all but reserved and excepted matters. However, acts of the Parliament of the United Kingdom remain supreme and can overrule the devolved legislatures. By convention, the Parliament of the United Kingdom does not normally do this without a legislative consent motion.

Sovereignty 
In the United Kingdom, Parliament is sovereign, so it is not bound by a Constitution or judicial review.

However, implied repeal of acts of Parliament is not now universally recognised: in Thoburn v Sunderland City Council, Laws LJ stated:
We should recognise a hierarchy of Acts of Parliament: as it were "ordinary" statutes and "constitutional" statutes. The two categories must be distinguished on a principled basis. In my opinion a constitutional statute is one which (a) conditions the legal relationship between citizen and State in some general, overarching manner, or (b) enlarges or diminishes the scope of what we would now regard as fundamental constitutional rights. (a) and (b) are of necessity closely related: it is difficult to think of an instance of (a) that is not also an instance of (b). The special status of constitutional statutes follows the special status of constitutional rights. Examples are the Magna Carta, the Bill of Rights 1689, the Act of Union, the Reform Acts which distributed and enlarged the franchise, the HRA, the Scotland Act 1998 and the Government of Wales Act 1998. The ECA clearly belongs in this family. It incorporated the whole corpus of substantive Community rights and obligations, and gave overriding domestic effect to the judicial and administrative machinery of Community law. It may be there has never been a statute having such profound effects on so many dimensions of our daily lives. The ECA is, by force of the common law, a constitutional statute.<p>Ordinary statutes may be impliedly repealed. Constitutional statutes may not. For the repeal of a constitutional act or the abrogation of a fundamental right to be effected by statute, the court would apply this test: is it shown that the legislature's actual – not imputed, constructive or presumed – intention was to effect the repeal or abrogation?This implied repeal thinking is later mentioned in R (HS2 Action Alliance Ltd) v Secretary of State for Transport, in relation to two "constitutional" statutes.

European law 
It is said that "Acts of Parliament are no longer sovereign but can be overruled if they are incompatible with European Laws", as was the case in Thoburn.

However, by virtue of express repeal in the European Union (Withdrawal) Act 2018, the UK has now left the European Union and this ceased to be the case when the Brexit transition period ended, on 31 December 2020.

Devolved statutes 

Parliament has also devolved significant powers to the Northern Ireland Assembly, Scottish Parliament and Senedd Cymru. Because of its sovereignty, it is free to overrule or even abolish these institutions (a recent instance when it did was the Northern Ireland (Executive Formation etc) Act 2019). However, this is unlikely in practice, in part because of the Sewel convention, a constitutional convention, which is now partly statutorised.

Secondary legislation 

Secondary legislation, otherwise known as delegated legislation, are devolved powers, primarily given to ministers.

International treaties 
International treaties are not ratified in the UK until a minister has laid a copy of the treaty before Parliament and 21 sitting days have passed without either House resolving that the treaty should not be ratified.

Historical records 
At the end of a medieval Parliament of England a collection of acts of a public character was made in the form of a Statute Roll and given the title of the King's regnal year. Each particular act formed a section, or a chapter, of the complete Statute, so that, e.g. the Vagabonds Act 1383 became VII Ric. II, c.5. Enrolment of Public Acts on manuscript parchment "Parliament Rolls" continued until 1850. The longest act of Parliament in the form of a scroll is an act regarding taxation passed in 1821. It is nearly a quarter of a mile (348 m) long, and used to take two men a whole day to rewind. 

Until 1850, a paper draft was brought into the House in which the Bill started. After the committee stage, the Bill was inscribed on a parchment roll and this parchment was then passed to the other House which could introduce amendments. The original Bill was never re-written. Knives were used to scrape away the script from the top surface of the rolls before the new text was added. Since 1850, two copies of each act were printed on vellum, one for preservation in the House of Lords and the other for transmission to the Public Record Office.

Since 1483 annual volumes of public acts ("Statute Books") have been printed. In these volumes, public acts but also some private acts and various "Local and Personal Acts declared Public" have been included.

All UK acts of Parliament since 1497 are kept in the House of Lords Record Office, including the oldest act: The "Taking of Apprentices for Worsteads in the County of Norfolk" Act 1497, a reference to the wool worsted manufacture at Worstead in Norfolk, England.

Acts passed before 1 January 1963 are cited by session and chapter. The session of parliament in which the act was passed is referred to by the regnal year or years of the reigning Monarch and his name, which is usually abbreviated. So, for example, the Treason Act 1945 may be cited:

All acts passed on or after 1 January 1963 are cited by calendar year and chapter.

All recent acts have a short title, or citation (e.g. Local Government Act 2003, National Health Service Act 1974). The Short Titles Act 1896 retrospectively gave short titles to old statutes that were still live.

Many acts of a private, personal or local character often have not ever been printed, surviving only in a single manuscript copy in the Victoria Tower.

Acts in force 
The UK's Ministry of Justice publishes most acts of Parliament in an online statute law database. It is the official revised edition of the primary legislation of the United Kingdom. The database shows acts as amended by subsequent legislation and is the statute book of UK legislation.

Acts of constitutional importance 
Important acts in UK constitutional history include:

Magna Carta – first law to limit the powers of the Monarch
Treason Act 1351 – codified the existing common law relating to treason.
Succession to the Crown Act 1533 – altered the succession by declaring Henry VIII's first daughter Mary ineligible to the throne.
Laws in Wales Acts 1535–1542 – annexed Wales to England.
Succession to the Crown Act 1536 – removed both of Henry VIII's daughters (Mary and Elizabeth) from being eligible to the throne.
Crown of Ireland Act 1542 – created the office of King of Ireland.
Succession to the Crown Act 1543 – Reinstated both of Henry VIII's daughters in the line of succession behind his son, establishing the principle of male-preference primogeniture.
Petition of Right (1628) – sets out specific liberties which the Monarch was prohibited from infringing.
Habeas Corpus Act 1679 – forced courts to examine the lawfulness of a prisoner's detention.
Bill of Rights 1689 – placed (or restated) limits on the monarch's power, formalising constitutional monarchy.
Act of Settlement 1701 – established the line of succession for the monarchy through the Protestant Sophia, Electress of Hanover, disinheriting all Catholics and those who married Catholics.
Act of Union 1707 – united the Kingdoms of England and Scotland into Great Britain, abolishing the Parliament of Scotland
Act of Union 1800 – united the Kingdoms of Great Britain and Ireland into the United Kingdom of Great Britain and Ireland
Reform Act 1832 – with later Reform Acts and Representation of the People Acts, made election to the House of Commons uniform, abolished the undemocratic rotten boroughs, and created new constituencies for newly populous industrial cities such as Birmingham
Parliament Act 1911 (amended 1949) – allowed the House of Commons to overrule the House of Lords after a delay
Welsh Church Act 1914 (in force 1920) – disestablished the state church in Wales, creating the Church in Wales
Representation of the People Act 1918 (amended 1928) – extended the right to vote to women
Statute of Westminster 1931 – gave constitutional independence to the British dominions overseas. Numerous powers of legislative and judicial dependency remained; several more acts have restricted or abolished these powers, for example the Canada Act 1982.
His Majesty's Declaration of Abdication Act 1936 – passed the abdication of King Edward VIII into law
Ireland Act 1949 – formally recognised the modern Republic of Ireland by the United Kingdom and abolished the monarchy in Ireland outside of Northern Ireland
European Communities Act 1972 – ratifies and incorporates the Treaty of Accession into UK law and made the UK part of what is now the European Union providing for the application of European law
Human Rights Act 1998 – enshrined the European Convention on Human Rights in domestic law, affecting government decision making, interpretation of law, and appeals
House of Lords Act 1999 – removed the automatic right of hereditary peers to sit in the House of Lords, leaving 92 seats reserved for hereditary peers to be filled by election by other eligible lords
Northern Ireland Act 1998 – established a devolved Northern Ireland Assembly and passed the Good Friday Agreement into law
Scotland Act 1998 – established a devolved Scottish Parliament
Government of Wales Act 1998 – created a devolved National Assembly for Wales
Greater London Authority Act 1999 – established an elected Mayor of London and an assembly for Greater London
Constitutional Reform Act 2005 - established the Supreme Court of the United Kingdom and reformed the office of Lord Chancellor
Government of Wales Act 2006 – conferred additional law-making powers to the National Assembly for Wales
Northern Ireland Act 2009 – devolved policing and justice to the Northern Ireland Assembly, averting the assembly from being abolished
Scotland Act 2012 – conferred additional powers to the Scottish Parliament
Succession to the Crown Act 2013 – established absolute progenitor primogeniture in succession to the Crown (abolishing male preference), and removed disqualification from those who marry Catholics, implementing the Perth Agreement between countries sharing the UK's monarch
Wales Act 2017 – changed Welsh devolution to the reserved powers model
European Union (Withdrawal) Act 2018 – enables transposition of EU law into UK law, repeals the European Communities Act 1972, and specifies processes and deadlines for ratifying a withdrawal agreement
European Union (Withdrawal Agreement) Act 2020 - ratifies and incorporates the Brexit withdrawal agreement into UK law and "saves" the effect of the European Communities Act 1972 until the end of the implementation period on 31 December 2020.

See also 
List of Acts of Parliament of the United Kingdom Parliament
Halsbury's Laws of England – encyclopaedic treatise on the laws of England and Wales
Halsbury's Statutes – standard work of authority on statute law in England and Wales
Church of England measures, which have the same force and effect of acts of Parliament.
Image of An act for taking of Apprentices to make Worsteds in the County of Norfolk on the Parliamentary Archives website

References

Further reading 
 

Statutory law
Governance in the United Kingdom